God Is an Astronaut are an Irish post-rock band from County Wicklow, formed in 2002 by Niels and Torsten Kinsella. Their style employs elements of electronic music, krautrock, and space rock, reminiscent of Tangerine Dream. The band currently consists of Niels and Torsten Kinsella, Lloyd Hanney, and Jamie Dean. They have released eleven studio albums to date.

History

The band was formed in 2002 by twin brothers Niels and Torsten Kinsella, who took the inspiration for its name from a quote in the movie Nightbreed. God Is an Astronaut's debut album, The End of the Beginning, was released in 2002 on the Revive Records label, which is independently owned by the band. The album was intended to be a farewell to the industry. Two music videos, for "The End of the Beginning" and "From Dust to the Beyond", both produced by the band, received airplay on MTV UK and other MTV Europe networks.

GIAA consider each of their albums to be a sonic "photograph or snapshot of who we are in that moment of time". In mid-2006, a licensing deal with U.K. label Rocket Girl saw both an EP, called A Moment of Stillness, and their second album, All Is Violent, All Is Bright, being re-released.

The band's third album, Far from Refuge, was released in April 2007 on Revive Records and as a download via their website. Their fourth, the self-titled God Is an Astronaut, came out on 7 November 2008. On 12 February 2010, a single was released on the band's website, titled "In the Distance Fading", the second song from their fifth album, called Age of the Fifth Sun, released on 17 May 2010. That year, the band became a quartet, with keyboardist/guitarist Jamie Dean joining.

God Is an Astronaut's sixth full-length album, Origins, was released in 2013. They then went on tour, performing in places such as China, Russia, Brazil, and Europe.

In June 2015, the band's seventh full-length album, Helios  Erebus, was released. 

In 2018, GIAA published Epitaph, their eighth full-length studio album.

In February 2021, the band released Ghost Tapes#10 on Napalm Records.

Live performances
God Is an Astronaut performed at the Eurosonic Festival in 2012, when Ireland was the "Spotlight Country". The band's live shows often make use of projected, self-edited footage along with lighting arrangements, to form what they call a "full audiovisual show". Each song is accompanied by its own video.

2008 US tour incident
In early 2008, GIAA embarked on their first tour of the United States. On the day they were set to return home, $20,000 worth of equipment was stolen from their van in New Jersey. Their equipment was not insured, and a tour that had reportedly already cost them $20,000 to organize suddenly doubled in cost.

Band members
Current
 Torsten Kinsella – vocals, guitars, keyboards (2002–present)
 Niels Kinsella – bass, guitars, visuals (2002–present)
 Lloyd Hanney – drums (2003–present)
 Jamie Dean – keyboards, synthesiser, guitar (2010–2017, 2020-present)Past' Gazz Carr – keyboards, synthesizer, guitar (2012–13, 2019)
 Robert Murphy – keyboards, synthesizer, guitar (touring, 2017–2019)

Discography

 The End of the Beginning (2002)
 All Is Violent, All Is Bright (2005)
 A Moment of Stillness (2006)
 Far from Refuge (2007)
 God Is an Astronaut (2008)
 Age of the Fifth Sun (2010)
 Origins (2013)
 Helios  Erebus (2015)
 Epitaph (2018)
 Ghost Tapes #10 (2021)
 Somnia'' (2022)

References

External links

 
 

Irish post-rock groups
Instrumental rock musical groups
Musical groups established in 2002
2002 establishments in Ireland
Musicians from County Wicklow
Rocket Girl artists
Napalm Records artists